Halmus chalybeus, commonly known as the steelblue ladybird, is a species of ladybird (the beetle family Coccinellidae) native to Australia. It has a rounded appearance with an iridescent blue/green colouration and is a predator of other insects. It was introduced to New Zealand from Australia in 1899 and 1905 to control black scale and blue gum scale (see scale insect) on citrus trees, where it is now common in northern regions. It has also been recorded eating San Jose scale. They are about 3–4 mm long.

See also
Harmonia conformis, the large spotted ladybird
Illeis galbula, the Fungus-eating ladybird
Two-spotted lady beetle

References

Further reading

Flynn,  Alan Richard. 1995. "Aspects of the biology of the steel blue ladybird Halmus chalybeus (Boisduval)  (Coleoptera : Coccinellida)". Thesis (MSc–Zoology (Biological Sciences)) University of Auckland. 105 leaves with illustrations.
Lo, P. L. (December 2000) Species and abundance of ladybirds (Coleoptera: Coccinellidae) on citrus orchards in Northland, New Zealand, and a comparison of visual and manual methods of assessment. New Zealand Entomologist 23: 61–65

Coccinellidae
Beetles of New Zealand
Beetles of Australia
Beetles described in 1835